The 2019 Japan Golf Tour season was played from 17 January to 8 December. The season consisted of 25 official money events, mostly in Japan. Other than the four majors, which are played outside Japan, there was one event played in Singapore and one event in South Korea. The SMBC Singapore Open was co-sanctioned by the Asian Tour. The Shinhan Donghae Open was co-sanctioned by the Asian Tour and the Korean Tour. The Zozo Championship was co-sanctioned by the PGA Tour (part of the 2019–20 PGA Tour season), the first ever such co-sanctioning.

Schedule
The following table lists official events during the 2019 season.

Unofficial events
The following events were sanctioned by the Japan Golf Tour, but did not carry official money, nor were wins official.

Money list
The money list was based on prize money won during the season, calculated in Japanese yen.

Notes

References

External links

Japan Golf Tour
Japan Golf Tour
Golf Tour